Lüttwitz is a German Silesian noble family. 

Heinrich Freiherr von Lüttwitz (1896–1969), German army officer and equestrian
Smilo Freiherr von Lüttwitz (1895–1975), German army general
Walther von Lüttwitz (1859–1942), German army general

German-language surnames
Military families of Germany